Prehnitene or 1,2,3,4-tetramethylbenzene is an organic compound with the formula C6H2(CH3)4, classified as an aromatic hydrocarbon. It is a flammable colorless liquid which is nearly insoluble in water but soluble in organic solvents. It occurs naturally in coal tar. Prehnitene is one of three isomers of  tetramethylbenzene, the other two being isodurene (1,2,3,5-tetramethylbenzene) and durene (1,2,4,5-tetramethylbenzene). It is a relatively easily oxidized benzene derivative, with E1/2 of 2.0 V vs NHE.

Production 
Industrially, prehnitene can be isolated from the reformed fraction of oil refineries. It may also be produced by methylation of toluene, xylenes and the trimethylbenzenes hemimellitene and pseudocumene.

References

Alkylbenzenes
C4-Benzenes